Daxiang District is one of three urban districts in Shaoyang City, Hunan province, China. The district is located in the south of the city proper and on the southeast shore of Zi River, it is bordered by Beita and Shuangqing Districts to the north, Shaodong County to the east, Shaoyang County to the south and the west. The district has nine subdistricts, one town and two townships under its jurisdiction. the government seat is Baizhou Community.

Administrative divisions
It has jurisdiction over the City Road, Red Road, the center of the road, a hundred Spring Garden, west, south, Crest, South Railway Station, College Road, Daxiang District nine district offices and rain Creek, paved surface, Tan Jiang, Cai E, Itabashi five townships.
9 subdistricts
 Baichunyuan
 Chengbeilu
 Chengnan
 Chengxi
 Cuiyuan
 Hongqilu
 Huochenanzhan
 Xueyuanlu
 Zhongxinlu

1 towns
 Luoshi

2 townships
 Banqiao
 Cai'e

Transportation
Shaoyang railway station on the Huaihua–Shaoyang–Hengyang railway and the Luoyang–Zhanjiang railway is located here.

References

External links
www.xzqh.org 

 
County-level divisions of Hunan
Shaoyang